Agabus abessinicus is a species of beetle belonging to the family Dytiscidae. It is found in Ethiopia.

References

Endemic fauna of Ethiopia
Beetles described in 1928
Insects of Ethiopia
Agabus (beetle)
Beetles of Africa